The 2014 Asian Women's Volleyball Cup, so-called 2014 AVC Cup for Women was the fourth edition of the Asian Cup, a biennial international volleyball tournament organised by the Asian Volleyball Confederation (AVC) with Chinese Volleyball Association (CVA). The tournament was held in Universiade Centre Indoor Stadium, Shenzhen, China from 6 to 12 September 2014.

Pools composition 
The teams are seeded based on their final ranking at the 2012 Asian Women's Cup Volleyball Championship.

Squads

Preliminary round

Pool A 

|}

|}

Pool B 

|}

|}

Final round

Quarterfinals 

|}

5th–8th semifinals 

|}

Semifinals 

|}

7th place 

|}

5th place 

|}

3rd place 

|}

Final 

|}

Final standing

Awards

MVP 
 Yan Ni
Best Setter 
 Ding Xia
Best Outside Spikers 
 Zhang Changning 
 Liu Yanhan

Best Middle Blockers 
 Yan Ni 
 Yang Hyo-jin
Best Opposite Spiker 
 Kim Yeon-koung
Best Libero 
 Miku Torigoe

See also
2014 Asian Men's Volleyball Cup

References

External links
 Asian Volleyball Confederation

Asian Women's Volleyball Cup
Asian Cup
V
V